Kiladi Jodi is 1978 Indian Kannada language film directed by S. V. Rajendra Singh Babu starring Lakshmi in a double role opposite Vishnuvardhan and Srinath.

Cast
 Vishnuvardhan
 Srinath
 Lakshmi
 Ambareesh (guest appearance)
 Vajramuni
 K. S. Ashwath
M. P. Shankar
Leelavathi
Pandari Bai
Uma Shivakumar
Jayamalini
 Dinesh
 Seetaram
 Shaktiprasad
M. S. Umesh

Songs

References

External links
 

1970s Kannada-language films
1978 films
Films scored by Rajan–Nagendra

Films directed by Rajendra Singh Babu